Horta Oest was a comarca in the province of Valencia, Valencian Community, Spain.

Municipalities

Alaquàs
Aldaia
Manises
Mislata
Paterna
Picanya
Quart de Poblet
Torrent
Xirivella

 
Comarques of the Valencian Community
Geography of the Province of Valencia